Abu Ubaidah or Abu Ubayda usually refers to Abu Ubayda ibn al-Jarrah, a Companion of the Prophet and Arab general.

Abu Ubaidah may also refer to:

 Abu Ubaidah, a 9th-century Muslim scholar
 Abu Ubaidah al-Banshiri, founding member of terrorist group al-Qaeda
 Abu Ubaidah al-Masri, an operative of al-Qaeda
 Abu Ubayd al-Thaqafi (died 634), a commander in the army of the Rashidun Caliphate
 Abu Obaida, spokesman of the military wing of the Islamist organization Hamas.